, also known as , is a Japanese comedian and television and radio personality. He rose to fame in the 2000s as one half of the manzai comedy duo The Nankai Candies. Outside Japan he is best known as one of the commentators on the reality television series Terrace House.

Life and career
Yamasato is a member of the 22nd graduating class of Yoshimoto Kogyo's New Star Creation school of comedy in Osaka. His first known owarai comedy duo was  together with Tomio Nishida from 1999 to 2003. Yamasato played the role of the boke or "funny man" to Nishida's tsukkomi or "straight man". However, in this duo Yamasato plays the tsukkomi, while Yamasaki is the boke. The Nankai Candies took second place in the 2004 M-1 Grand Prix, leading to many television appearances and subsequently moved their base from Osaka to Tokyo. That year they also won the 25th ABC Newcomer Comedian Grand Prix Newcomer Award. In 2005 they received the 40th Kamigata Manzai Grand Prix Newcomer Award and the 43rd Golden Arrow Newcomer Award. They competed several more times in the M-1 Grand Prix; coming in ninth place in 2005 and eighth in 2009, and being eliminated in the semifinals in 2008, 2016 and 2017. Beginning in 2007, the Nankai Candies were not active much while Yamasaki competed as a boxer. She even became a women's middleweight champion before retiring from the sport in 2015.

Beginning with season 3 of Terrace House: Boys × Girls Next Door on April 12, 2013, Yamasato became a studio commentator on the reality TV series Terrace House. He has continued this role on each installment of the franchise, where he is known as the cynical one who enjoys highlighting the house members' flaws. In 2015, he was given his own spin-off on Netflix Japan's YouTube channel titled Yama Channel where he comments solo.

Yamasato co-authored two books that were both released on June 25, 2013. News no Yomikata Oshiemasu! explains recent political and economic words in an easy-to-understand manner, while Yamasato Ryōta no 'Tarinai' Eigo teaches simple English for communication.

Yamasato played the villain in the 2016 Shuriken Sentai Ninninger vs. ToQger the Movie: Ninja in Wonderland. Since October 2016, Yamasato and his fellow Terrace House commentator You have co-hosted the puppet show Nehorin Pahorin on NHK Educational TV. They each voice mole puppets who co-interview the non-famous guest represented by a pig puppet. The anonymity afforded via the puppets and voice modulation allows the guests to talk candidly about topics not usually covered on mainstream TV, such as idol otaku or host club addiction.

Yamasato voiced the character Karasutengu in the 2017 anime film Pretty Cure Dream Stars!. He released Tensai wa Akirameta, a completely revised and updated version of his 2006 autobiographical book Tensai ni Naritai, on July 6, 2018, and it sold 100,000 copies in two months. A fan of One Piece since its beginning, Yamasato voiced the character Donald Moderate in the 2019 One Piece: Stampede film.

Personal life
On June 3, 2019, Yamasato married actress Yū Aoi. The two first met through Shizuyo Yamasaki, who co-starred with Aoi in the film Hula Girls (2006), and began dating in April 2019. In episode six of Terrace House: Tokyo 2019–2020, Yamasato credited his job on the show for the marriage, as Aoi is a fan and wanted to talk to him about it. On February 10, 2022, the couple announced that Aoi was pregnant with their first child and due in the summer. On August 10, 2022, Yamasato revealed that Aoi had given birth to their daughter.

Selected filmography

Television
Nihiiro Jean (2008–2015)
Sukkiri (2009–present)
Hirunandesu! (2011–2020)
Out×Deluxe (2012–present)
Terrace House: Boys × Girls Next Door (2013–2014)
Terrace House: Boys & Girls in the City (2015–2016)
Nehorin Pahorin (2016–present)
Terrace House: Aloha State (2016–2017)
Shin Shock-kan (2017–present)
Tōdai-ō (2017–present)
Terrace House: Opening New Doors (2017–2019)
Gyakuten Jinsei (2019–present)
Made in Japan! (2019–2020)
Hinekure 3 (2019–2020)
Terrace House: Tokyo 2019–2020 (2019–2020)
ReAL eSports News (2019–present)
Yamasato Ryota no Masaka no Berserker (2020)
Doyō wa Nanisuru!? (2020–present)
Azatokute Nani ga Warui no? (2020–present)

Live-action films
Tomica Hero: Rescue Force Explosive Movie: Rescue the Mach Train! (2008) - Doctor Mad/Matarou Madono
Terrace House: Closing Door (2015)
Shuriken Sentai Ninninger vs. ToQger the Movie: Ninja in Wonderland (2016) - Dark Doctor Mavro
Uchūjin no Aitsu (2023)

Animation
Detective Conan: Full Score of Fear (2008)
Aoi Bungaku (No Longer Human) (2009)
Kikansha Tōmasu Dīzeru 10 no Gyakushū (2012)
Pretty Cure Dream Stars! (2017)
One Piece: Stampede (2019)

Bibliography

 – editor
 – co-authored with Akira Ikegami
 – co-authored with Mita Masaki
 – co-authored with Masato Honma

Championships and accomplishments 
 DDT Pro-Wrestling
Ironman Heavymetalweight Championship (2 times)

References

External links

People from Chiba (city)
Japanese male comedians
1977 births
Living people
Kansai University alumni
Japanese television presenters
Ironman Heavymetalweight Champions